Night Rider is a 1978 album by Oscar Peterson and Count Basie.

Track listing
 "Night Rider" (Oscar Peterson) - 12:38
 "Memories of You" (Eubie Blake, Andy Razaf) - 4:55
 "9:20 Special" (William Engvick, Earle Warren) - 3:16
 "Sweet Lorraine" (Cliff Burwell, Mitchell Parish) - 7:03
 "It's a Wonderful World" (Harold Adamson, Jan Savitt, Johnny Watson) - 3:17
 "Blues for Pamela" (Count Basie, Peterson) - 8:06

Personnel
Recorded February 21, 22, 1978 in Los Angeles:

 Count Basie - piano, organ
 Oscar Peterson - piano
 Louie Bellson - drums
 John Heard - double bass
 Nat Hentoff  - liner notes
 Val Valentin - engineer
 Greg Fulginiti - mastering
 Norman Granz - producer

References

1978 albums
Count Basie albums
Oscar Peterson albums
Pablo Records albums
Albums produced by Norman Granz